{{Infobox television
| image                = 
| genre                = Horror Comedy
| director             = 
| based_on             = {{Based on|
Mr. Midnight by James Lee
}}
| developer            = 
| starring             = 
| theme_music_composer = 
| opentheme            = 
| endtheme             = 
| composer             = 
| country              = 
| language             = English
| num_seasons          = 1
| num_episodes         = 13
| list_episodes        = 
| executive_producer   = 
| location             = 
| cinematography       = 
| editor               = 
| camera               = 
| runtime              = 
| company              = 
| distributor          = 
| network              = 
| picture_format       = 
| audio_format         = 
| first_aired          = 
}}Mr. Midnight: Beware the Monsters'' is a Netflix series produced by Beach House Pictures. It is an adaptation of the popular Singaporean book series Mr. Midnight by James Lee. It premiered on 24 October 2022.

Background
The Mr. Midnight book series consists of 129 books, including 27 special edition copies. It is Asia's bestselling children's book series with over 3 million copies sold. The books have been translated into Burmese, Malay, Indonesian, and Chinese.

Plot
A group of detective friends solve strange, paranormal and extra-terrestrial occurrences in their town, Tanah Merah. They record their experiences in their blog titled "Mr. Midnight".

Cast
Idan Aedan as Tyar
Chen Yixin as Ling
Caleb Monk as Nat
Nikki Dekker as Zoe
Lim Yu-Beng as Uncle Tan (Ling's father)
Adinia Wirasti as Sylvia
Sam Pleitgen as Jimmy K (Ben's father)
Shafiqhah Efandi as Zihan (Tyar's mother)
Firdaus Rahman as Lufti (Tyar's father)
Maxime Bouttier as Ben

Episodes

Production 
In October 2018, Beach House Pictures announced that the series was in production and that it would feature "stories inspired by the books". Filming was conducted in Batam and Singapore in a "‘90s gothic-style setting".

Reception 
Fans of the book series took to social media to comment on the lack of promotion for the series. Twitter users expressed hopes that the would be greater promotion and said that they had been unaware about the series.

References

2020s Singaporean television series
English-language Netflix original programming